Connor Watson (born 31 May 1996) is an Australian professional rugby league footballer who plays as a  and  for the Sydney Roosters in the NRL.

He previously played for the Newcastle Knights in the National Rugby League, and played for the Country Origin side.

Early life
Watson was born in Dubbo, New South Wales, Australia and is of Indigenous Australian descent. At the age of five, he moved to Avoca Beach, New South Wales.

He played his junior rugby league for the Terrigal Sharks and Kincumber Colts, before gaining a scholarship at Knox Grammar School and playing rugby union. While playing rugby union, he spent part of his time playing rugby league with the South Eastern Seagulls. He was then signed by the Sydney Roosters.

Playing career

Early career
In 2015 and 2016, Watson played for the Sydney Roosters' NYC team. In July 2015, he re-signed with the Sydney Roosters on a two-year contract.

2016
In round 7 of the 2016 NRL season, Watson made his NRL debut for the Sydney Roosters against the Penrith Panthers. In round 13 against the Wests Tigers, he scored his first NRL try. In December, he extended his Roosters contract from the end of 2017 until the end of 2018.

2017
At the 2017 NRL Auckland Nines in February, Watson was named player of the tournament after the Roosters won the final.  On 7 May, Watson played for Country Origin against City Origin off the interchange bench in the 20–10 loss in Mudgee. On 24 July, he signed a 3-year contract with the Newcastle Knights starting in 2018, after seeking a release from the final year of his Sydney Roosters contract.

2018
In round 1 of the 2018 season, Watson made his debut for Newcastle in their 19-18 golden point extra-time win over the Manly Warringah Sea Eagles. In round 2 against the Canberra Raiders, Watson scored his first try for the Newcastle club in their 30–28 win at Canberra Stadium.

2020
After suffering a number of ankle problems during Newcastle's 2020 NRL season, Watson suffered a ruptured achilles playing against the Canterbury-Bankstown Bulldogs in the Round 11, 18–12 loss, ending his season.

2021
After playing over 60 games for the Newcastle club, Watson chose to knock back a contract extension and instead signed a two-year contract to return to the Sydney Roosters in 2022.

2022
Watson played a total of 21 games for the Sydney Roosters in the 2022 NRL season including the clubs elimination final loss to South Sydney.

References

External links
Newcastle Knights profile
NRL profile

1996 births
Australian rugby league players
Indigenous Australian rugby league players
Country New South Wales Origin rugby league team players
Newcastle Knights players
Sydney Roosters players
Junior Kangaroos players
Rugby league five-eighths
Rugby league fullbacks
Rugby league hookers
Rugby league locks
Living people
People educated at Knox Grammar School
Rugby league players from Dubbo